Tillandsia kegeliana is a species of flowering plant in the genus Tillandsia. This species is native to Panama, Colombia, the Guianas, northeastern Brazil and Venezuela.

References

kegeliana
Flora of South America
Flora of Panama
Plants described in 1896